Clinton Adams (December 11, 1918 – May 13, 2002) was an American artist and art historian. He was known for his contributions to the field of lithography.

Biography
Adams was born in Glendale, California. He worked in the art department of the University of California, Los Angeles, (UCLA) but eventually left to serve in the military. He returned to UCLA in 1946. From 1961 to 1976, he was the Dean of the University of New Mexico.

As a painter, Adams worked in several mediums, including oil, acrylic, watercolor painting, and egg tempera. He also produced lithographs, and was the co-author of The Tamarind Book of Lithography (1971), an important description of the process. Among his other writings is American Lithographers (1987), a history of the art in the United States from 1900 to 1960.

Adams received the Governor's Award for "Outstanding Contributions to the Arts of New Mexico" in 1985, and in 1992 he became a member of the National Academy of Design. He died of liver cancer on May 13, 2002, in Albuquerque, New Mexico.

References

External links
Clinton Adams papers, 1934-2002 from the Smithsonian Archives of American Art
Oral history interview with Clinton Adams, 1974 Mar. 29 from the Archives of American Art
Oral history interview with Clinton Adams, 1995 Aug. 2-3 a second interview from the Archives of American Art

1918 births
2002 deaths
American art historians
American lithographers
Deaths from liver cancer
Writers from Glendale, California
20th-century American historians
American male non-fiction writers
UCLA School of the Arts and Architecture faculty
University of New Mexico faculty
Deaths from cancer in New Mexico
American military personnel of World War II
20th-century American male writers
Historians from California
20th-century lithographers